Werner Jannick Heyking (14 June 1913 – 10 October 1974) was a Danish actor who was active in television films and serials during the 1960s and early 1970s.

Heyking had a small role in the 1971 film Willy Wonka & the Chocolate Factory as Charlie Bucket's boss Mr. Jopeck. He also appeared in the film Downhill Racer (1969). Heyking's final role came in 1973 in an episode of the television series Tatort.

Heyking died the following year on 10 October 1974 from throat cancer.

Filmography

External links 
 

1913 births
1974 deaths
Danish male film actors
Danish male television actors
Deaths from cancer in Denmark
20th-century Danish male actors
Deaths from throat cancer